Samuel Hawkes (27 September 1845 – 16 February 1937) was an Australian politician.

Hawkes was born in Witham in Essex in 1845. In 1886 he was elected to the Tasmanian House of Assembly, representing the seat of Ringarooma. He served until 1893. He died in 1937 in Scottsdale.

References

1845 births
1937 deaths
Members of the Tasmanian House of Assembly